"Watcher of the Skies" is the first track on Genesis' 1972 album Foxtrot. It was also released as the album's only single.

Background
The title is borrowed from John Keats' 1817 poem "On First Looking into Chapman's Homer":

The song was frequently used to open the group's live performances and features as the first track on their 1973 live album Genesis Live. The song opens with a Mellotron intro. According to Tony Banks, the introductory section was intended to take advantage of idiosyncrasies in the tuning of the Mellotron model he was using at the time:

The two chords in question are Bmaj7/F# and C#/F#. The long keyboard introduction crossfades into the main ensemble section, which features a prominent single-note staccato pattern in a 6/4 time signature (reminiscent of the 5/4 rhythmic pattern from "Mars" in Gustav Holst's The Planets suite) played over a pattern of sustained organ chords. Following the vocal sections of the song, there is an unusual polyrhythm part, where the staccato riff changes to 8/4 time, played against a Mellotron/organ chord part in 6/4.

The lyrics were written by Banks and Mike Rutherford during a soundcheck for a gig in Naples. While they were surveying the deserted landscape of the airfield where they were rehearsing, they wondered what an empty Earth would look like in this state if surveyed by an alien visitor. The lyrics were influenced by the Arthur C. Clarke 1953 science fiction novel Childhood's End (as were Pink Floyd's 1972 "Childhood's End" and Van der Graaf Generator's 1976 "Childlike Faith in Childhood's End"). The science fiction characters Watchers also influenced the lyrics.

It opened the band's shows during 1972–74 and (in abridged form) remained a staple in the band's live set into the 1980s. In later years, it has been played in a medley following the track "It" (from 1974 The Lamb Lies Down on Broadway), as can be heard on Three Sides Live (1982). The song was never performed with lyrics after Peter Gabriel's departure.

During performances, Peter Gabriel wore bat wings on the side of his head, glowing UV make-up around his eyes, and a multicoloured cape.

The song was re-recorded in 1972 in a radically altered and shortened single version. This version was re-released in 1998 as part of the Genesis Archive 1967–75 box set.

The song title was used in naming of the tribute album Watcher of the Skies: Genesis Revisited (1996) by ex-Genesis member Steve Hackett. On the album, the lead vocal was provided by John Wetton. In the liner notes to the album, Steve Hackett wrote:

The song was played live during the Foxtrot, Selling England by the Pound, The Lamb Lies Down on Broadway, A Trick of the Tail, and Three Sides Live tour encores.

The song was performed live by Phish at the 2010 Rock & Roll Hall of Fame induction ceremony on 15 March 2010 at the Waldorf-Astoria hotel in New York City. The band also performed "No Reply at All" after Trey Anastasio's induction speech.

Personnel 
 Peter Gabriel – lead vocals, tambourine, bass drum
 Tony Banks – Hammond organ, Mellotron, backing vocals
 Steve Hackett – electric guitar
 Mike Rutherford – bass, bass pedals, backing vocals
 Phil Collins – drums, backing vocals

References 

Genesis (band) songs
1972 songs
Songs written by Peter Gabriel
Songs written by Tony Banks (musician)
Songs written by Phil Collins
Songs written by Steve Hackett
Songs written by Mike Rutherford